= Mark Windham =

American pathologist

Mark Windham is an American pathologist, currently a Distinguished Professor in Ornamental Pathology at University of Tennessee.
